The Riga Hydroelectric Power Plant Crossing Pylon is an overhead powerline crossing of the Daugava River, near Salaspils in the Latvia.
The present crossing was built in 1974, and includes one 112-metre tall lattice tower. 
It is the tallest electricity pylon in the Latvia.

See also 
 Riga Hydroelectric Power Plant

External links 

 
 Panoramio - Photo of DAUGAVA_RIVER-1
 Panoramio - Photo of Elektrolīnija pāri Daugavai
 Panoramio - Photo of Unnamed Road, Salaspils lauku teritorija, LV-2121, Latvia

Towers completed in 1974
Electric power infrastructure in Latvia
Towers in Latvia
Powerline river crossings
Pylons
Lattice towers